Edyta Korotkin (born 18 April 1972) is a Polish archer. She competed in the women's individual and team events at the 1992 Summer Olympics.

References

1972 births
Living people
Polish female archers
Olympic archers of Poland
Archers at the 1992 Summer Olympics
People from Kołobrzeg